Louise Bessette,  (born June 20, 1959) is a Canadian pianist. Born in Montreal, she trained at the Conservatoire de musique du Quebec a Montreal (CMQM).

Awards 
In 2001, she was made a member of the Order of Canada in recognition for "her great talent and contribution to contemporary music". In 2005, she was made an Officer of the National Order of Quebec. In 2014 she was awarded an Opus Award for Performer of the Year. In 2019 she received the Lifetime Artistic Achievement Award from the Governor General's Performing Arts Awards.

References

External links
 Louise Bessette at The Canadian Encyclopedia
Louise Bessette  in Wikipedia (en français)

1959 births
Living people
Canadian classical pianists
Canadian women pianists
Members of the Order of Canada
Musicians from Montreal
Officers of the National Order of Quebec
21st-century classical pianists
Women classical pianists
21st-century women pianists